Horní Branná is a municipality and village in Semily District in the Liberec Region of the Czech Republic. It has about 1,900 inhabitants.

Administrative parts
The village of Valteřice is an administrative part of Horní Branná.

Notable people
Jan Slavomír Tomíček (1806–1866), writer and journalist
František Hák (1903–?), cross-country skier
Václav Jón (1905–1966), cross-country skier
Zdeněk Remsa (1928–2019), ski jumper
Ilja Matouš (1931–2018), cross-country skier

References

External links

Villages in Semily District